Phuong Soksana (born March 2, 1992 in Cambodia) is a former footballer for National Defense Ministry in the Cambodian League.

He has represented Cambodia at senior international level.

International goals

Honours

Club
National Defense Ministry
Hun Sen Cup: 2010, 2016

References

External links
 

1992 births
Living people
Cambodian footballers
Cambodia international footballers
Sportspeople from Phnom Penh
Association football forwards